FIRE is a rock band from Malta.  Founded in 1998, the band's line-up includes vocalist Kenneth Calleja, guitarists Joe Vella and Robert Longo, bassist Trevor Catania and drummer Robert Spiteri.  The band has released three albums, which have received favorable reviews.

Band members
Current
 Kenneth Calleja - lead vocals
 Joseph (Pejxa) Vella - guitar
 Robert Longo - guitar
 Trevor Catania - bass guitar
 Robert Spiteri - drums

Former
 Mark Abela - drums
 Charles Cassar - bass guitar
 Laurence Baldacchino - drums
 Ruben Micallef - bass guitar

Discography

Studio albums
 Flight to Cuba/Soul on Ice (2005)
 Ignite (2006)
 Thrill Me (2009)

Singles
 "Miss You This Christmas" (2007)

References

External links 
 

Musical groups established in 1998